Subacromial bursitis is a condition caused by inflammation of the bursa that separates the superior surface of the supraspinatus tendon (one of the four tendons of the rotator cuff) from the overlying coraco-acromial ligament, acromion, and coracoid (the acromial arch) and from the deep surface of the deltoid muscle. The subacromial bursa helps the motion of the supraspinatus tendon of the rotator cuff in activities such as overhead work.

Musculoskeletal complaints are one of the most common reasons for primary care office visits, and rotator cuff disorders are the most common source of shoulder pain.

Primary inflammation of the subacromial bursa is relatively rare and may arise from autoimmune inflammatory conditions such as rheumatoid arthritis, crystal deposition disorders such as gout or pseudogout, calcific loose bodies, and infection. More commonly, subacromial bursitis arises as a result of complex factors, thought to cause shoulder impingement symptoms. These factors are broadly classified as intrinsic (intratendinous) or extrinsic (extratendinous). They are further divided into primary or secondary causes of impingement. Secondary causes are thought to be part of another process such as shoulder instability or nerve injury.

In 1983 Neer described three stages of impingement syndrome. He noted that "the symptoms and physical signs in all three stages of impingement are almost identical, including the 'impingement sign'..., arc of pain, crepitus, and varying weakness". The Neer classification did not distinguish between partial-thickness and full-thickness rotator cuff tears in stage III. This has led to some controversy about the ability of physical examination tests to accurately diagnose between bursitis, impingement, impingement with or without rotator cuff tear and impingement with partial versus complete tears.

In 2005, Park et al. published their findings which concluded that a combination of clinical tests were more useful than a single physical examination test. For the diagnosis of impingement disease, the best combination of tests were "any degree (of) a positive Hawkins–Kennedy test, a positive painful arc sign, and weakness in external rotation with the arm at the side", to diagnose a full thickness rotator cuff tear, the best combination of tests, when all three are positive, were the painful arc, the drop-arm sign, and weakness in external rotation.

Signs and symptoms
Subacromial bursitis often presents with a constellation of symptoms called impingement syndrome. Pain along the front and side of the shoulder is the most common symptom and may cause weakness and stiffness. If the pain resolves and weakness persists other causes should be evaluated such as a tear of the rotator cuff or a neurological problem arising from the neck or entrapment of the suprascapular nerve. The onset of pain may be sudden or gradual and may or may not be related to trauma. Night time pain, especially sleeping on the affected shoulder, is often reported. Localized redness or swelling are less common and suggest an infected subacromial bursa. Individuals affected by subacromial bursitis commonly present with concomitant shoulder problems such as arthritis, rotator cuff tendinitis, rotator cuff tears, and cervical radiculopathy (pinched nerve in neck).

Impingement may be brought on by sports activities, such as overhead throwing sports and swimming, or overhead work such as painting, carpentry, or plumbing. Activities that involve repetitive overhead activity, or directly in front, may cause shoulder pain. Direct upward pressure on the shoulder, such as leaning on an elbow, may increase pain.

Pathophysiology
The literature on the pathophysiology of bursitis describes inflammation as the primary cause of symptoms. Inflammatory bursitis is usually the result of repetitive injury to the bursa. In the subacromial bursa, this generally occurs due to microtrauma to adjacent structures, particularly the supraspinatus tendon. The inflammatory process causes synovial cells to multiply, increasing collagen formation and fluid production within the bursa and reduction in the outside layer of lubrication.

Less frequently observed causes of subacromial bursitis include hemorrhagic conditions, crystal deposition and infection.

Many causes have been proposed in the medical literature for subacromial impingement syndrome. The bursa facilitates the motion of the rotator cuff beneath the arch, any disturbance of the relationship of the subacromial structures can lead to impingement. These factors can be broadly classified as intrinsic such as tendon degeneration, rotator cuff muscle weakness and overuse. Extrinsic factors include bone spurs from the acromion or AC joint, shoulder instability and neurologic problems arising outside of the shoulder.

Diagnosis
It is often difficult to distinguish between pain caused by bursitis or that caused by a rotator cuff injury as both exhibit similar pain patterns in the front or side of the shoulder. Subacromial bursitis can be painful with resisted abduction due to the pinching of the bursa as the deltoid contracts. If the therapist performs a treatment direction test and gently applies joint traction or a caudal glide during abduction (MWM), the painful arc may reduce if the problem is bursitis or adhesive capsulitis (as this potentially increases the subacromial space).

The following clinical tests, if positive, may indicate bursitis:
 The patient actively abducts the arm and a painful arc occurs between 60° and 120°. This is due to the compression of the supraspinatus tendon or subacromial bursa between the anterior acromial arch and humeral head. When lowering from full abduction there is often a painful "catch" at midrange. If the patient can achieve adequate muscle relaxation, passive motion tends to be less painful.
 The patient performs an isometric flexion contraction against resistance of the therapist (Speed’s Test). When the therapist’s resistance is removed, a sudden jerking motion results and latent pain indicates a positive test for bursitis.
 Neer’s Sign: If pain occurs during forward elevation of the internally rotated arm above 90°. This will identify impingement of the rotator cuff but is also sensitive for subacromial bursitis.

Irritation or entrapment of the lower subscapular nerve, which innervates the subscapularis and teres major muscles, will produce muscle guarding at the shoulder that will restrict motion into external rotation, abduction, or flexion. The aforementioned tests will assist in diagnosing bursitis over other conditions. The diagnosis of impingement syndrome should be viewed with caution  in people who are less than forty years old, because such individuals may have subtle glenohumeral instability.

Imaging
X-rays may help visualize bone spurs, acromial anatomy and arthritis. Further, calcification in the subacromial space and rotator cuff may be revealed. Osteoarthritis of the acromioclavicular (AC) joint may co-exist and is usually demonstrated on radiographs.

MRI imagining can reveal fluid accumulation in the bursa and assess adjacent structures. In chronic cases caused by impingement tendinosis and tears in the rotator cuff may be revealed. At US, an abnormal bursa may show
 fluid distension,
 synovial proliferation, and/or
 thickening of the bursal walls.
In any case, the magnitude of pathological findings does not correlate with the magnitude of the symptoms.

Special considerations
In patients with bursitis who have rheumatoid arthritis, short term improvements are not taken as a sign of resolution and may require long term treatment to ensure recurrence is minimized. Joint contracture of the shoulder has also been found to be at a higher incidence in type two diabetics, which may lead to frozen shoulder (Donatelli, 2004).

Treatment
Many non-operative treatments have been advocated, including rest; oral administration of non-steroidal anti-inflammatory drugs; physical therapy; chiropractic; and local modalities such as cryotherapy, ultrasound, electromagnetic radiation, and subacromial injection of corticosteroids.

Shoulder bursitis rarely requires surgical intervention and generally responds favorably to conservative treatment. Surgery is reserved for patients who fail to respond to non-operative measures. Minimally invasive surgical procedures such as arthroscopic removal of the bursa allows for direct inspection of the shoulder structures and provides the opportunity for removal of bone spurs and repair of any rotator cuff tears that may be found.

Early / initial

Middle / intermittent

Late / return to function

Prognosis
In 1997 Morrison et al. published a study that reviewed the cases of 616 patients (636 shoulders) with impingement syndrome (painful arc of motion) to assess the outcome of non-surgical care. An attempt was made to exclude patients who were suspected of having additional shoulder conditions such as, full-thickness tears of the rotator cuff, degenerative arthritis of the acromioclavicular joint, instability of the glenohumeral joint, or adhesive capsulitis. All patients were managed with anti-inflammatory medication and a specific, supervised physical-therapy regimen. The patients were followed up from six months to over six years. They found that 67% (413 patients) of the patients improved, while 28% did not improve and went to surgical treatment. 5% did not improve and declined further treatment.

Of the 413 patients who improved, 74 had a recurrence of symptoms during the observation period and their symptoms responded to rest or after resumption of the exercise program.

The Morrison study shows that the outcome of impingement symptoms varies with patient characteristics. Younger patients (20 years or less) and patients between 41 and 60 years of age, fared better than those who were in the 21 to 40 years age group. This may be related to the peak incidence of work, job requirements, sports and hobby related activities, that may place greater demands on the shoulder. However, patients who were older than sixty years of age had the "poorest results". It is known that the rotator cuff and adjacent structures undergo degenerative changes with ageing.

The authors were unable to posit an explanation for the observation of the bimodal distribution of satisfactory results with regard to age. They concluded that it was "unclear why (those) who were twenty-one to forty years old had less satisfactory results". The poorer outcome for patients over 60 years old was thought to be potentially related to "undiagnosed full-thickness tears of the rotator cuff".

References 

 Anderson, D., M, (2000), Dorland’s Illustrated Medical Dictionary, 29th ed, W.B. Saunders Company, Canada, 965-967.
 Buschbacher, R., M, Braddom, R., L. (1994). Sports medicine & rehabilitation: A sport-specific approach. Hanley and Belfus Inc, Philadelphia.
 Hartley, A. (1990). Practical joint assessment: A sports medicine manual, St Louis, Sydney.

Further reading 
 Arend CF. Ultrasound of the Shoulder. Master Medical Books, 2013. Free chapter on bursae around the shoulder joint.

External links 

Soft tissue disorders
Synovial bursae
Inflammations